The Third Schmidt cabinet was the government of Germany between 6 November 1980 and 1 October 1982, during the 9th legislature of the Bundestag. Led by the Social Democrat Helmut Schmidt. After the 1980 federal election, incumbent Chancellor Schmidt continued the social-liberal coalition between his SPD and the FDP.

In 1982 the coalition collapsed. A first cabinet reshuffle was performed on 28 April, replacing several ministers. The split culminated in the resignation of all FDP ministers on 17 September. Schmidt briefly replaced them with an all-SPD cabinet before being voted out of office in a constructive vote of no confidence in favour of Helmut Kohl, who formed the first Kohl cabinet.

Composition

References

 

Coalition governments of Germany
Historic German cabinets
Cabinets established in 1980
Cabinets disestablished in 1982
1980 establishments in West Germany
1982 disestablishments in Germany
Helmut Schmidt